Kochadhaman Assembly constituency is an assembly constituency in Kishanganj district in the Indian state of Bihar.

Overview
As per Delimitation of Parliamentary and Assembly constituencies Order, 2008, No 55 Kochadhamin Assembly constituency is composed of the following: Kochadhamin community development block; Belwa, Gachhpara, Chakla, Mehangaon, Daula and Pichhla gram panchayats of Kishanganj CD Block.

Kochadhaman Assembly constituency is part of No 10 Kishanganj (Lok Sabha constituency).

Members of the Bihar Legislative Assembly 
Following is the list of Members of Legislative Assembly from Kochadhaman Vidhan Sabha.

^ denotes by-poll

Election results

2015
Mujahid Alam of JDU defeated Akhtarul Iman of AIMIM. BJP candidate Abdur Rahman got third position in this election.

2015

2020

References

External links
 

Assembly constituencies of Bihar
Politics of Kishanganj district